Spadoni is an Italian surname. Notable people with the surname include:

Eugenia Spadoni, later known as Mimì Aylmer (1896–1992), Italian actress
Maria Edera Spadoni (born 1979), Italian politician
Valerio Spadoni (born 1950), Italian footballer and coach

Italian-language surnames
Surnames of Italian origin